Psi Aquilae, Latinized as ψ Aquilae, is the Bayer designation for a star in the equatorial constellation of Aquila. It is a faint star with an apparent visual magnitude of 6.25, which, according to the Bortle Dark-Sky Scale, can be seen with the naked eye in dark rural skies.

The spectrum of Psi Aquilae matches a stellar classification of B9 III-IV, with the luminosity class of III-IV indicating the spectrum lies part way between that of a subgiant and a giant star. The effective temperature of the star's outer atmosphere is 10,814 K, giving it the blue-white hue of a B-type star. It has nearly four times the radius of the Sun and has a projected rotational velocity of 20 km/s.

References

External links
 Image Psi Aquilae

B-type giants
Aquila (constellation)
Aquilae, Psi
BD+12 4059
Aquilae, 48
186547
097139
7511